George Ridley (29 November 1886 – 4 January 1944) was a Labour Party politician in England.

He was elected as the Member of Parliament (MP) for Clay Cross at a by-election in September 1936, filling the vacancy caused by the death of Alfred Holland at the age of 36. Like his predecessor, Ridley did not live until the next general election but died in January 1944 at 57. At the time of his death he was the Chairman of the National Executive of the Labour Party. He was survived by his wife, Ethel, and his children, Philip and Betty.

References

External links 
 

1886 births
1944 deaths
Labour Party (UK) MPs for English constituencies
UK MPs 1935–1945
Members of the Parliament of the United Kingdom for constituencies in Derbyshire
Chairs of the Labour Party (UK)
Transport Salaried Staffs' Association-sponsored MPs